Ralph Maud (December 24, 1928 – December 8, 2014) was a Canadian literary scholar.  He was a professor at English at Simon Fraser University and was regarded as an expert on the work of poets Dylan Thomas and Charles Olson.

Bibliography
Maud served as editor for several anthologies published by Talonbooks in Vancouver, Canada:

 1978; The Salish People: The Local Contribution of Charles Hill-Tout
 1982: A Guide to B.C. Indian Myth and Legend 
 1987: The Chilliwacks and Their Neighbors
 1993: The Porcupine Hunter and Other Stories
 2000: Transmission Difficulties: Franz Boas and Tsimshian Mythology
 2004: Poet to Publisher: Charles Olson’s Correspondence with Donald Allen
 2008: Charles Olson at the Harbor
 2010: Muthologos: Lectures and Interviews, Revised Second Edition (by Charles Olson) edited by Ralph Maud 
 2014: After Completion: The Later Letters of Charles Olson and Frances Boldereff co-edited with Sharon Thesen 

In 1989 J. M. Dent and Company published his edition of notebook poems of Dylan Thomas:
 The Notebook Poems 1930–34

In 1996 Southern Illinois University Press published Maud's work on Charles Olson:
 Charles Olson's Reading: A Biography

References

1928 births
2014 deaths
Academic staff of Simon Fraser University
Canadian non-fiction writers
Writers from British Columbia